Jayne Mansfield Busts Up Las Vegas is a novelty album featuring actress, model, singer and Playmate Jayne Mansfield published in 1962 by 20th Century Fox. It was a recording of her show "The House of Love" in Dunes Hotel and Casino. Other artists in the album are Arthur Blake (voice) Mickey Hargitay (commentary), The Bill Reddie Orchestra (orchestra), Bill Reddie (conductor)

Tracks
 A House Is Not A Home Without Love
 Interview: Jayne And Louella [Parsons]
 I Think I'm Gonna Like It Here
 Tete a Tete: Jayne And Bette [Davis]
 Just Plain Jayne
 Jayne And Charles [Laughton] Bit
 Plenty Of Love And Twenty Calories
 Jayne And Noel [Coward] Confab
 I'm Physical, You're Cultural
 Jayne And Talullah [Bankhead] Skirmish
 I Had What You've Got When I Had It
 Let's Do It

Citation

1962 live albums
Jayne Mansfield albums
20th Century Fox Records albums
1960s comedy albums
Live albums recorded in the Las Vegas Valley